The 1986–87 Cypriot Second Division was the 32nd season of the Cypriot second-level football league. APEP FC won their 1st title.

Format
Fifteen teams participated in the 1986–87 Cypriot Second Division. All teams played against each other twice, once at their home and once away. The team with the most points at the end of the season crowned champions. The first two teams were promoted to 1987–88 Cypriot First Division. The last two teams were relegated to the 1987–88 Cypriot Third Division.

Changes from previous season
Teams promoted to 1986–87 Cypriot First Division
 Ethnikos Achna FC
 Omonia Aradippou

Teams promoted from 1985–86 Cypriot Third Division
 APEP FC
 Digenis Akritas Ipsona
 Onisilos Sotira

League standings

See also
 Cypriot Second Division
 1986–87 Cypriot First Division
 1986–87 Cypriot Cup

References

Cypriot Second Division seasons
Cyprus
1986–87 in Cypriot football